This is a summary of the year 2008 in Canadian literature.

Events
January 8 - A television series based on Douglas Coupland's novel jPod debuts on CBC Television.
February 29 - Paul Quarrington's 1987 novel King Leary wins the 2008 edition of Canada Reads.
June 12 - Rawi Hage's 2006 novel De Niro's Game wins the 2008 International Dublin Literary Award.
July 1 - Writers Maria Campbell, George Elliott Clarke and Audrey Thomas are inducted into the Order of Canada.
November 11 - Joseph Boyden's novel Through Black Spruce wins the 2008 Scotiabank Giller Prize.
November 18 - 2008 Governor General's Awards.

Books

Fiction
 David Adams Richards, The Lost Highway
André Alexis, Asylum
David Bergen, The Retreat
Joseph Boyden, Through Black Spruce
Austin Clarke, More
Anthony De Sa, Barnacle Love
Cory Doctorow, Little Brother
Emma Donoghue, The Sealed Letter
Marina Endicott, Good to a Fault
Steven Galloway, The Cellist of Sarajevo
Bill Gaston, The Order of Good Cheer
Rawi Hage, Cockroach
Kenneth J. Harvey, Blackstrap Hawco
Maggie Helwig, Girls Fall Down
Mark Anthony Jarman, My White Planet
Ibi Kaslik, The Angel Riots
Patrick Lane, Red Dog, Red Dog
Pasha Malla, The Withdrawal Method
Andrew Pyper, The Killing Circle
Paul Quarrington, The Ravine
Nino Ricci, The Origin of Species
Robert J. Sawyer, Identity Theft and Other Stories
Mary Swan, The Boys in the Trees
Miriam Toews, The Flying Troutmans

Non-fiction
Margaret Atwood, Payback: Debt and the Shadow Side of Wealth
Stephen Clarkson, My Life as a Dame: The Personal and the Political in the Writings of Christina McCall
Charles Foran, Join the Revolution, Comrade
Mark Frutkin, Erratic North: A Vietnam Draft Resister's Life in the Canadian Bush
Stephen Henighan, A Report on the Afterlife of Culture
Val Ross, Robertson Davies: A Portrait in Mosaic
Norman Snider, The Roaring Eighties and Other Good Times
Drew Hayden Taylor, Me Sexy: An Exploration of Native Sex and Sexuality

Poetry
R. M. Vaughan, Troubled

Deaths
 February 17 - Val Ross, writer and journalist
 June 11 - James Reaney, novelist
 July 14 - Lawrence Ytzhak Braithwaite, writer and musician

Literature